Chronicles I may refer to:

 Books of Chronicles
 Chronicles I (album), an album by Eloy